(born 7 January 1997) is a Japanese pop singer and dancer. She is a tenth-generation member and sub-leader of the pop group Morning Musume.

Biography

Early life
Ayumi Ishida was born on 7 January 1997, in Sendai, Miyagi, Japan. Prior to debuting in Morning Musume, she was as back-up dancer for Dorothy Little Happy.

2011–present: Debut in Morning Musume
On 29 September 2011, at a concert at Nippon Budokan, which was part of Morning Musume Concert Tour 2011 Aki Ai Believe: Takahashi Ai Sotsugyō Kinen Special, it was announced that Ishida had passed the auditions alongside three other girls: Haruna Iikubo, Masaki Satō and Haruka Kudō, and would join Morning Musume.

In October 2012, Ishida was announced as a member of the new Satoyama Movement unit, Harvest, alongside, Erina Ikuta, Masaki Satō and Akari Takeuchi. In March 2013, Ishida was announced as a member of the new Satoumi Movement unit, Plumeria.

On 31 December 2018, she became sub-leader of Morning Musume alongside Erina Ikuta.

Discography
For Ayumi Ishida's releases with Morning Musume, see Morning Musume discography.

Bibliography

Photobooks
 (July 15, 2013, Wani Books)
Shine More (May 10, 2014, Wani Books)
It's My Turn (June 27, 2016, Wani Books)
20th Canvas (April 27, 2018, Wani Books)
Believe in Oneself (January 7, 2020, Wani Books)

Filmography

DVDs and Blu-rays

Television
 (NTV, 2012)

References 

Japanese women pop singers
Japanese female dancers
Living people
Morning Musume members
Japanese female idols
1997 births
Musicians from Miyagi Prefecture
People from Sendai